(Midnight), WAB 80, is a song composed by Anton Bruckner in 1869.

History 
Bruckner composed the song on a text of Joseph Mendelssohn in November 1869, for the 25th anniversary of Linz Liedertafel Frohsinn.

The work, of which the original manuscript is stored in the archive of Liedertafel Frohsinn, was first issued by Doblinger in 1903. It was reissued in 1911 by Viktor Keldorfer (Universal Edition), together with the two other Bruckner's "midnight-songs" (Um Mitternacht, WAB 89 and WAB 90).

Text 

Mitternacht uses a text by Joseph Mendelssohn.

Music 
The 84-bar long work in A-flat major is scored for  choir, tenor soloist and piano. Strophe 1 is sung by the choir with an ostinato of the piano. In strophe 2, bars 49-58, the soloist is singing with accompaniment of the choir and unison lines of sixteenth notes of the piano. The piece is ending pianissimo.

Discography 

Mitternacht, WAB 80, is one of the most popular Bruckner's Weltliche Chorwerke. The first recording of Mitternacht was by Willi Schell with the Cronenberger Männerchor in 1956 – 45 rpm: Tonstudio Wolfgang Jakob (Dortmund)

A selection of the other recordings:
 Walther Schneider, Josef Traxel (tenor), Stuttgarter Liederkranz, Hubert Giesen (piano) –  LP: Odeon O/STO 41453, 1961
 Guido Mancusi, Herbert Lippert (tenor), Chorus Viennensis, Walter Lochmann (piano), Musik, du himmlisches Gebilde! – CD: ORF CD 73, 1995
 Thomas Kerbl, Männerchorvereinigung Bruckner 08, Mariko Onishi (Piano), Anton Bruckner – Männerchöre – CD: LIVA027, 2008
 Jan Schumacher, Christoph Prégardien (tenor), Camerata Musica Limburg, Andreas Frese (Piano) Serenade. Songs of night and love – CD: Genuin GEN 12224, 2011

References

Sources 
 Anton Bruckner – Sämtliche Werke, Band XXIII/2:  Weltliche Chorwerke (1843–1893), Musikwissenschaftlicher Verlag der Internationalen Bruckner-Gesellschaft, Angela Pachovsky and Anton Reinthaler (Editor), Vienna, 1989
 Cornelis van Zwol, Anton Bruckner 1824–1896 – Leven en werken, uitg. Thoth, Bussum, Netherlands, 2012. 
 Uwe Harten, Anton Bruckner. Ein Handbuch. , Salzburg, 1996. .
 Crawford Howie, Anton Bruckner - A documentary biography, online revised edition

External links 
 
  
 Mitternacht As-Dur, WAB 80 – Critical discography by Hans Roelofs 
 These performances of Mitternacht can be heard on YouTube:
 Dritan Luca with the Wiener Staatsopernchor (2007):  Mitternacht
 Stojan Kuret with the Vokalna akademija of Ljubljana (2020): Anton Bruckner, Mitternacht WAB 80

Weltliche Chorwerke by Anton Bruckner
1869 compositions
Compositions in A-flat major